Girl in White in the Woods is an oil painting created in 1882 by Vincent van Gogh.

Of a study that Van Gogh made for Girl in a Wood or Girl in White in the Woods, he remarked at how much he enjoyed the work and explains how he wishes to trigger the audience's senses and how they may experience the painting: "The other study in the wood is of some large green beech trunks on a stretch of ground covered with dry sticks, and the little figure of a girl in white. There was the great difficulty of keeping it clear, and of getting space between the trunks standing at different distances - and the place and relative bulk of those trunks change with the perspective - to make it so that one can breathe and walk around in it, and to make you smell the fragrance of the wood."

See also
List of works by Vincent van Gogh
Early works of Vincent van Gogh
Paintings of Children (Van Gogh series)

References

External links

Paintings by Vincent van Gogh
Paintings of the Netherlands by Vincent van Gogh
1882 paintings